Arturo Godoy (October 10, 1912 – 1986) was a Chilean professional boxer, also nicknamed "Arturito".

Biography
He was born in Iquique on October 10, 1912. He was South American Heavyweight Champion and had an extensive and successful career in Argentina, Cuba, Spain, and the United States roughly between 1931 and 1954. In New York, he beat Tony Galento.

He is best known for his two epic fights with Joe Louis for the World Heavyweight Championship in 1940. The first was held at the Madison Square Garden on February 10, 1940, and went the full length of 15 rounds. The 2 ringside judges split their votes and the tie was broken by the referee, who gave it to Louis, to the protest of a substantial part of the audience, who had been won over by the fact that Godoy showed no fear of Louis and by the additional fact that Louis was not able to knock out his opponent after a string of K.O.s and T.K.O.s. South Americans and Chileans in particular thought that Godoy had indeed won the fight and from then on the figure of Godoy acquired mythical proportions. A second fight was scheduled for June 20, 1940. Joe Louis prepared to counteract Godoy's strategy and ring tactics, focusing on bringing him up from his unusual low stance with a combination of hooks to the body and uppercuts. Godoy fought bravely but the referee had to stop the fight in the 8th round. Godoy continued fighting until 1954 and returned to Chile, where he was regarded as a hero.

He died in Chile in 1986.

Legacy
His life was used as the base for the novel "Muriendo por la dulce patria mía" (Planeta, 1998) by Roberto Castillo Sandoval.

Professional boxing record

External links
 

1912 births
1986 deaths
Heavyweight boxers
People from Iquique
Chilean male boxers
20th-century Chilean people